Marie Birkl  (born 1 February 1981) is a Swedish snowboarder. She was born in Mariefred. She competed at the 1998 Winter Olympics, in giant slalom.

References

External links 
 

1981 births
Living people
People from  Strängnäs Municipality
Swedish female snowboarders
Olympic snowboarders of Sweden
Snowboarders at the 1998 Winter Olympics
Sportspeople from Södermanland County
20th-century Swedish women